Bike Share Toronto is a bicycle-sharing system in Toronto, Canada. Bike Share Toronto recorded 3,575,000 trips in 2021. The system was launched in 2011 by PBSC Urban Solutions under the BIXI brand and was taken over by the Toronto Parking Authority in 2014.

History
Bike Share Toronto launched in 2011 as BIXI Toronto, with 80 stations centred around the downtown core of Toronto and 1,000 bicycles. The system was operated by PBSC.

In 2013, PBSC announced that it was unable to pay back $3.9 million of a $4.5 million loan from the City of Toronto and filed for bankruptcy. The City decided to cover the loan by diverting money from an automated public-toilets program. The City then took control of the bike-share program, and April 1, 2014, the Toronto Parking Authority (TPA) took control of the system, and renamed it to Bike Share Toronto. The new operator of the system was Alta Bicycle Share (now Motivate).

A planned expansion of 22 stations for the 2015 Pan Am/Parapan Am Games was abandoned. The original stations operated on a hybrid platform; software was supplied by 8D and hardware came from PBSC. Later, each company developed its own full system of hardware and software, no longer supporting integration of components with other vendors. As a result, all existing stations would have to be replaced or retrofitted.

System expansion 
The first expansion launched in June 2016, with $4.9 million in funding provided by Metrolinx and $1.1 million in Section 37 funds. The expansion added 120 stations and 1,000 bikes, for a total of 2,000 bicycles and 200 stations. The TPA chose PBSC as the supplier of the new bicycles and stations. As part of the agreement, PBSC would also retrofit the existing stations to be compatible with the new stations.

On April 1, 2017, the TPA transitioned the day-to-day operation of Bike Share Toronto to Shift Transit, a PBSC partner company, while maintaining ownership of the system.

A further expansion of the system took place in August 2017, with the system expanding to 270 stations, 2,750 bikes and 4,700 docks, with $4 million in expansion funding from the Government of Canada and the City of Toronto. The August 2018 expansion expanded the station to 360 stations, 3,750 bikes, and 6,200 docks. By the end of 2019, 105 new stations and 1,250 more bikes had been added to the system in 2019, with a corresponding increase in ridership to over 2.4 million.

In June 2020, it was announced that the system would expand substantially, with 1,850 new bicycles and 160 stations outside the downtown core, such as in North York and Scarborough. This expansion would also add 300 e-bikes to the system, allowing easier journeys in hilly parts of the city and speeding up long-distance journeys.

In 2020, due to the COVID-19 pandemic and consequential stay-at-home orders, ridership grew by 20%, with records being set for both the busiest day and the busiest weekend on the system. The number of people with annual memberships increased to   465,000 from 2019 to 2020, around double the previous figure. 

In 2021, ridership again grew by 20% to 3.5 million, with the TPA calling the growth “tremendous". On May 16th 2021, 27,000 riders were taken, setting a new one day ridership record. TPA also noted a large increase in the number of riders following the installation of bike lanes on Bloor Street. Toronto Bike Share began piloting a 45 minute membership, as well as developing a growth plan for future system expansion. 

In 2022, TPA announced that work on a 4 year growth plan had begun, with objectives such as increasing the number of stations to 1,000, expanding the spread of the system across all 25 wards of Toronto, improve first and last mile connections and increase equitable access to the system. Initial expansion in 2022 would include 13 new stations as well as 225 new e-bikes & 100 regular bikes.

Ridership

Ridership numbers denote "trips" per year; one "trip" is usually between 1 and 30 minutes. The system's fee structure strongly encourages longer-distance commuters to split each journey into shorter "trips" of 30 minutes or less.

Payment 
As of July 2021, there is a tiered system. Annual membership gives multiple station-to-station trips all year round. These trips have upper limit of 30 minute for $99 and 45 minutes for $115. There are also passes for unlimited 30 minute trips during a set duration. For 72 hours it is $15 and for 24-hour access it costs $7. A single one-way trip up to 30 minutes costs $3.25.

For every trip exceeding 30 minutes (or 45 minutes with the Annual 45 membership), overage fees will accumulate at a rate of $4 for each (up to) 30 minutes of additional trip time. To avoid an overage charge, before the 30 minute (or 45 minute) trip is up, users can dock the bike and unlock another to continue riding.

Bikes

The bicycles are utility bicycles; they have a unisex step-through frame with an upright seating position. They are equipped with internal hub gears, drum brakes, fenders, chain guard, generator lights, and a front rack. The conventional bikes are PBSC's "Iconic" model. The e-bikes which have been ordered for the e-bike pilot project are PBSC's "E-Fit" model. All the bikes have been configured with three-speed hubs. There are also 300 pedal-assist e-bikes available, which were added in the 2020 expansion.

Mobile apps

A mobile app can be used to rent bikes, instead of using the payment kiosk at stations. The officially-recommended mobile app is the "PBSC" app (formerly named "CycleFinder"). A competing app, called Transit, also works.

Sponsorship and promotions

Between late 2014 and 2016, TD Canada Trust sponsored Toronto Bike Share, covering "all operating costs" at a cost of $750,000 a year. This sponsorship was not renewed. In 2020, the TPA signed a 3 year deal with Bell Media (Astral) for advertising rights at stations. The TPA also stated that they were investigating the potential of a systemwide corporate sponsor, similar to other systems like Santander Cycles in London.

Free Ride Wednesdays
In June 2017, Toronto Mayor John Tory announced a "Free Ride Wednesdays" program, which allowed anyone to take free trips of up to 30 minutes on every Wednesday in July 2017. There were no limits to the number of trips per day. Fees applied only if any one single trip exceeded 30 minutes. Free Ride Wednesdays were also held in June 2018 and August 2019. Afterwards, Bike Share Toronto signed a multi-year sponsorship agreement with CAA in order to cover future Free Ride Wednesdays.

See also
 Cycling in Toronto

References

External links

 
 PBSC mobile app
 Transit App

Community bicycle programs
Cycling in Toronto
Bicycle sharing in Canada